Hrhov is a village and large municipality in the Rožňava District in the Košice Region of middle-eastern Slovakia.

History
In historical records the village was first mentioned in 1263.

Geography
It has a population of about 1200 people.

Culture
The village has a public library, a gymnasium and a football pitch.

Genealogical resources

The records for genealogical research are available at the state archive "Statny Archiv in Kosice, Slovakia"

 Roman Catholic church records (births/marriages/deaths): 1697-1899 (parish A)

Nature

In the village there is Hrhov Waterfall, which is the largest in the Slovak Karst. It is located directly in the village between the residential houses.

See also
 List of municipalities and towns in Slovakia

References

External links
 Hrhov
Surnames of living people in Hrhov

Villages and municipalities in Rožňava District